John Ballentine may refer to:

 John Goff Ballentine (1825–1915), American politician
 John J. Ballentine (1896–1970), United States naval aviator

See also

 John Ballantyne (disambiguation)